Sergey Kochetkov (born 7 August 1973) is a Russian fencer. He competed in the individual and team épée events at the 2004 Summer Olympics.

References

External links
 

1973 births
Living people
Russian male fencers
Olympic fencers of Russia
Fencers at the 2004 Summer Olympics
Martial artists from Moscow